Circumstella is a genus of sea snails, marine gastropod mollusks in the family Liotiidaewithin the superfamily Trochoidea, the top snails, turban snails and their allies.

Species
Species within the genus Circumstella include:
 Circumstella biconcava Feng, 1996
 Circumstella biconcave Feng, 1996
 Circumstella devexa (Hedley, 1901)

References

External links
 To World Register of Marine Species

 
Liotiidae
Gastropod genera